Xanthotype attenuaria, the attentive crocus soldier moth, is a species of geometrid moth in the family Geometridae. It is found in North America.

The MONA or Hodges number for Xanthotype attenuaria is 6744.

References

Further reading

 

Angeronini
Articles created by Qbugbot
Moths described in 1918